The 1909–10 season saw Rochdale become champions of the Lancshire Junior Cup. They also came 4th out of 20 in the Lancashire Combination Division 2 and reached the first qualifying round of the F.A. Cup.

Statistics

 

|}

Competitions

Lancashire Combination Division 2

F.A. Cup

Lancashire Junior Cup

Friendlies

References

Rochdale A.F.C. seasons
Rochdale